Win Naing Soe (born 24 October 1993) is a footballer from Burma, and a midfielder for  Yadanarbon FC. He is the top goalscorer of both 2016 Myanmar National League and 2016 General Aung San Shield tournaments after scoring a combine total of 22 goals in one calendar year.

Honours

Club

Yadanarbon
Myanmar National League (2):  2014, 2016

Individual
 Myanmar National League Top scorer (2): 2016, 2019 
 General Aung San Shield Top scorer (1): 2016

References
Win Naing Soe FB
Yadanarbon pages

1993 births
Living people
Burmese footballers
Myanmar international footballers
Association football forwards
Yadanarbon F.C. players
Sportspeople from Mandalay